"Becky" is the first single of Plies's fourth album, Goon Affiliated. The track was released on the internet by Plies via his Twitter.  
 
The song had its radio station premiere on Power 107.1 in Macon, Georgia on June 23, 2009. The song has since sold over 2,789,000 copies, also peaked at number #1 on Bubbling Under Hot 100 and Hot R&B/Hip-Hop Songs.

It's also the 6th time Plies and producer J.R. Rotem have worked together. They worked together on Plies previous singles "Bust It Baby Pt. 2" featuring Ne-Yo and "Want It, Need It" featuring Ashanti.

Music video
The video premiered on September 22, 2009.  Freeway and Rick Ross make cameos appearances in the video. The song refers to a woman who is good at performing oral sex, in which "Becky" is a slang term.

Chart performance

Certifications

References

2009 singles
2009 songs
Plies (rapper) songs
Dirty rap songs
Song recordings produced by J. R. Rotem
Songs written by Plies (rapper)
Songs written by J. R. Rotem
Atlantic Records singles